Frederick James Tucker, Baron Tucker PC (22 May 1888 – 17 November 1975) was a British judge.

Tucker was born in Pietermaritzburg, Natal (now South Africa), and was educated at Winchester and at New College, Oxford. He was called to the Bar (Inner Temple) in 1914, and was commissioned into the Army as a lieutenant during World War I. After the war, he became the pupil of Rayner Goddard (later Lord Goddard) and joined his chambers. He was made King's Counsel in 1933.

He was recorder of Southampton in 1936–37, and became Justice of the King's Bench Division of the High Court,  between 1937 and 1945, receiving the customary knighthood upon his appointment. In 1945, Tucker presided over the trial of William Joyce (Lord Haw Haw) for treason at the Central Criminal Court.

Invested as a privy Councillor on 30 October 1945, Tucker was Lord Justice of Appeal from 1945 to 1950, became an Honorary Fellow of New College, Oxford in 1946. He was appointed Lord of Appeal in Ordinary 29 September 1950, and was created  a life peer with the title Baron Tucker of Great Bookham in the County of Surrey. In 1961, he retired as Lord of Appeal.

Selected judgments

 Shaw v DPP

References

1888 births
1975 deaths
Tucker 
Members of the Privy Council of the United Kingdom
Members of the Judicial Committee of the Privy Council
Members of the Inner Temple
Alumni of New College, Oxford
People from Pietermaritzburg
Knights Bachelor
Life peers created by George VI